The 1981 NCAA Division I Field Hockey Championship was the first annual tournament to determine the national champion of NCAA Division I collegiate field hockey in the United States. The Connecticut Huskies won the first championship, defeating the Massachusetts Minutewomen in the final.

Bracket

All-tournament team  
Sue Caples, Massachusetts
Tish Stevens, Massachusetts
Judy Strong, Massachusetts

References 

NCAA Division I Field Hockey Championship
Field Hockey
NCAA